B. Ajaneesh Loknath (born 20 November 1985) is an Indian composer who works predominantly for Kannada cinema. He received the Karnataka State Film Award for Best Music Director for his work in the film Ulidavaru Kandanthe in 2015. He is known for his collaborations with Rakshit Shetty, Rishab Shetty, and Anup Bhandari.

Controversy 
Kerala-based band Thaikkudam Bridge accused  him  and the makers of movie Kantaara for plagiarising their song Navarasam for the film’s track, Varaha Roopam.

Career
Ajaneesh Loknath has composed music for Ulidavaru Kandanthe, Kirik Party,  Avane Srimannarayana and background score for Rangitaranga. He has sung for Ulidavaru Kandanthe, Ishtakamya, Kirik Party and has also sung songs for his own films. His career has also excelled in the field of music composition and singing. He has done movies for Ramesh Aravind, Dr.Shivrajkumar, Golden Star Ganesh, Bharathiraja, Nivin Pauly, Udhayanidhi Stalin , Duniya Vijay and many others.

He got his film Ulidavaru Kandanthe assigned for eight fields in the Radio Mirchi Music Awards South 2015. He got his film Rangitarangas background score designated for an Oscar. Till date, he has worked for more than 25 films in many languages.

Discography 

 All films are in Kannada, otherwise noted.

Awards and nominations

References

External links
 
 

Living people
Kannada film score composers
Filmfare Awards South winners
1986 births
Film musicians from Karnataka
Tamil film score composers
Telugu film score composers
21st-century Indian composers
People from Shimoga district
Indian male film score composers
21st-century male musicians